The Art of Dying is a 2000 Spanish horror film directed by Álvaro Fernández Armero from a screenplay by Juan Vicente Pozuelo and Curro Royo.

Cast

Release 
The film was theatrically released in Spain on 31 March 2000.

Accolades 

|-
| rowspan = "2" align = "center" | 2001 || rowspan = "2" | 15th Goya Awards || Best Original Song || Cristina Lliso, Suso Saiz, Tito Fargo ||  || rowspan = "2" | 
|-
| Best Special Effects || Reyes Abades,  || 
|}

See also 
 List of Spanish films of 2000

References

External links 

2000 horror films
Spanish slasher films
2000s Spanish films
2000s Spanish-language films